Viby may refer to:

 Viby, Kristianstad, a village in Kristianstad Municipality, Sweden
 Viby, Sollentuna, part of Sollentuna Municipality, Sweden
 Viby, Närke, a village in Närke and parish of the diocese of Strängnäs, Sweden
 Viby J, a town in Jutland, Denmark
 Viby J station, a railway station
 Viby Sj, a town on the island of Zealand, Denmark
 Marguerite Viby, a Danish actress

See also 

 Visby